Kedah Malay or Kedahan; also known as Pelat Utara or Loghat Utara ('Northern Dialect') or as it is known in Thailand, Syburi Malay is a variety of the Malayic languages mainly spoken in the northwestern Malaysian states of Perlis, Kedah, Penang, and northern Perak and in the southern Thai provinces of Trang and Satun. The usage of Kedah Malay was historically prevalent in southwestern Thailand before being superseded by the Thai language. Enclaves of Kedah Malay can be found in Kawthaung District in Myanmar; Ranong and Krabi in upper southern Thailand; Jaring Halus, Langkat and Aceh in Sumatra, Indonesia and up north in Bangkok, central Thailand, where most of the Kedah Malay speakers are descendants of historical settlers from Kedah.

Kedah Malay can be divided into several dialects, namely Kedah Persisiran (Littoral Kedah; which is the de facto prestige dialect of Kedah Malay), Kedah Utara (Northern Kedah), Perlis-Langkawi, Penang and some others outside Malaysia. Speakers in Trang as well as Satun are heavily influenced by the Thai language. However in the district of Baling, they speak a different variant more closely related to Kelantan-Patani Malay than it is to Kedah Malay.

Phonology

Consonants 

Note(s):
 Word initially:
  is pronounced as the velar fricative  in the syllable onset.
 In certain loan words,  is pronounced as an alveolar trill  such as in   'market'.
 Word finally:
 After , this  is palatalised, so   'hot' is pronounced .
  is realised as a pharyngeal fricative  so   'hungry' is pronounced .

Vowels

Monophthongs 

Note(s):

Diphthongs 
Kedah Malay has four diphthongs  with  being a surplus diphthong that does not exist in Standard Malay.

Comparison with Standard Malay 
Below is a comparison between Kedah Malay and Standard Malay.

Vocabulary

References

Citations

Bibliography

External links
 Kedahan-Standard Malay Online dictionary

Agglutinative languages
Malay dialects
Languages of Malaysia
Languages of Thailand
Languages of Myanmar

Malayic languages